The 2019 Chrono des Nations was the 38th edition of the Chrono des Nations cycle race, organised as a 1.1 race on the UCI Europe Tour, was held on 20 October 2019. The race started and finished in Les Herbiers. The race was won by Jos van Emden.

Result

Result (Men U23)

References

2019
2019 in road cycling
2019 in French sport
October 2019 sports events in France